Monty Don's Paradise Gardens is a television series of 2 programmes in which British gardener and broadcaster Monty Don travels across the Islamic world and beyond in search of paradise gardens and considering their place in the Quran. A book based on the series, Paradise Gardens: The World's Most Beautiful Islamic Gardens, was also published.

See also
 Around the World in 80 Gardens
 Monty Don's French Gardens
 Monty Don's Italian Gardens

References

External links
 Review in The Guardian, 20 January 2018
 Review in Residence Magazine (in Swedish), 5 June 2020
 Review by Marthe Bijman of the book, 18 June, 2018
 Review in The Herald, 19 Jan, 2018
 

BBC television documentaries
Gardening television
2000s British travel television series